Igor Volkov (born 1983) is a Russian ice hockey player

Igor Volkov may also refer to:

 Igor Volkov (Uzbekistani footballer) (born 1971), Uzbekistani football player